The Irish folk song "Mursheen Durkin" tells the story of an emigrant from Ireland who goes to mine for gold in California during the California Gold Rush, 1849. The song is about emigration, although atypically optimistic for the genre. The name "Muirsheen" is a good phonetic approximation to the pronunciation of "Máirtín" (Martin) in Connacht Irish; it could alternatively be construed as a diminutive of "Muiris" (Maurice). A pratie is a potato, the historical staple crop of Ireland. "America" is pronounced "Americay", as was common among Gaelic peoples around Ireland.

The air to which it is sung is "Cailíní deasa Mhuigheo" (pretty girls of Mayo), which is a popular reel dating from the 19th century.

Performers
The song reached prominence when Johnny McEvoy's recording reached no. 1 in Ireland in 1966.

It has been covered by the following artists (and others):
 Christy Moore
 Sharon Shannon
 Four to the Bar on their live album Craic on the Road.
 The Pogues
 The Irish Rovers (both as "Muirsheen Durkin" and as "Goodbye Mrs. Durkin")
 Johnny McEvoy
 The Dubliners
 The Poxy Boggards
 Golden Bough
 The Mollys on their album Hat Trick
 Off Kilter on their album Celtic Armadillo
 Darby O'Gill
 The Wolfe Tones
 1916 on their album Last Call for Heroes
 Na Fianna

Variations
"Molly Durkin" is an Irish folk song made popular by Murty Rabbett in the 1940s in the United States. It is a derivation of "Mursheen Durkin".
The song has a lively tempo and a man who decides to give up his work as a mortar shoveler (probably an asphalt shoveler as well) to take up shoveling gold in California is whimsically described. The song is not so much a song of leaving Ireland as it is an Irishman's response to a woman's scorn.

The Irish Rovers made several changes to the lyrics:
Retitled to "Goodbye Mrs. Durkin"
"I was never tired resortin'"
"and the other house besides", suggesting a "house of ill repute"
"as sure as my name is Barney"
"I'll write you from New York", which fits the meter better
Includes some lyrics contained in the song "Molly Durkin"

Recordings:
Murty Rabbett & His Gaelic Band: "Farewell To Ireland" Properbox 3(P1109-12) (1999/2005)
Ballinasloe Fair-Early Recordings Of Irish Music In America Traditional Crossroads CD 4284, CD (1998/2005)

References

External links
 http://www.affthecuff.org.uk/songs/mursheen.html
 http://www.8notes.com/scores/5619.asp?ftype=midi

Year of song unknown
California Gold Rush
Irish-American culture
Irish folk songs
Songs about California
The Dubliners songs
Traditional ballads
19th-century songs
Irish Singles Chart number-one singles